Wuhan Yangtze International School (WYIS) is an English-language international school located within the Wuhan Economic and Technological Development Zone (WEDZ) in Wuhan, Hubei, China. 

WYIS follows an American curriculum and serves students in grades PreK-12. It opened in August 2003 as the South Lake International School. The school started out with only seven students, but has grown to about 300, who come from about 30 different countries and territories, including Australia, Canada, France, Japan, South Korea, Switzerland, and the United States. About 30% of students are from South Korea. The school has about 50 foreign teachers, of which about 80% are US citizens.

History

The International Schools Consortium includes Wuhan Yangtze International School (iSC). iSC is a subsidiary of the LDi group of companies. 

WYIS began in 2003 as South Lake International School. It relocated to San Jiao Hu Elementary School in the WEDZ in 2005 and adopted its current name in 2007. WYIS received full accreditation in 2008 and its official international school license from the PRC's national government in 2011. Construction on its current campus began in 2012, and the school moved in January 2014.

Accreditations and Authorizations 
Wuhan Yangtze International School is accredited, authorized, or a member of the following organizations:
 American Chamber of Commerce in the People's Republic of China (Amcham China)
 College Board 
 East Asia Regional Council of Schools (EARCOS)
 International Schools Consortium (iSC)
 North Central Association Commission on Accreditation and School Improvement (NCA CASI)
 Northwest Accreditation Commission (NWAC)
 Southern Association of Colleges and Schools Council on Accreditation and School Improvement (SACS CASI)
 Ministry of Education (China)

References

External links

 Wuhan Yangtze International School
 International School Consortium

Education in Wuhan
International schools in China